Jiggs and Maggie Out West is a 1950 American comedy film directed by William Beaudine and starring Joe Yule, Renie Riano and George McManus. It was the final film in the Jiggs and Maggie film series, featuring the adventures of a bickering Irish-American couple.

Plot
Jiggs and Maggie inherit a gold mine in a western town, but have difficulty finding it.

Main cast
 Joe Yule as Jiggs 
 Renie Riano as Maggie 
 George McManus as George McManus 
 Tim Ryan as Dinty Moore 
 Jim Bannon as 'Snake-Bite' Carter 
 Riley Hill as Bob Carter 
 Pat Goldin as Dugan 
 June Harrison as Nora 
 Henry Kulky as 'Bomber' Kulkowich 
 Terry McGinnis as 'Cyclone' McGinnis 
 Billy Griffith as Lawyer Blakely

References

Bibliography
 Marshall, Wendy L. William Beaudine: From Silents to Television. Scarecrow Press, 2005.

External links

1950 films
American comedy films
American black-and-white films
1950 comedy films
1950s English-language films
Films based on American comics
Films based on comic strips
Films directed by William Beaudine
Live-action films based on comics
Monogram Pictures films
Bringing Up Father
1950s American films